The Simpson Investment Company is a company based in McCleary, Washington in the US Pacific Northwest that specializes in manufacture of forest products. Founded as a logging company in 1890 by Sol Simpson, the company now functions as a holding company for the Simpson Door Company, a manufacturer of wood doors.

Simpson announced in 2008 that it will be entering the "green power" industry by building a new power plant at its Tacoma Tideflats mill that will generate power via the burning of sawmill and other forest waste. In August 2009, construction of the power plant was completed. It generates 55 megawatts of power which is sold to Iberdrola Renovables and used by the Sacramento Municipal Utility District. The company is owned by the Reed family. William G. Reed Jr is a chairman on the board.

Divisions
The company was split into two units in 2006. The Green Diamond Resource Company is a spinoff that was created to manage Simpson's forest lands. Both companies are owned by the same shareholders and as with the current subsidiaries, function as separate departments within a large company rather than as completely independent companies. After the split, the three operating subsidiaries of Simpson Investment Company are Simpson Timber Company, Simpson Paper Company, and Simpson Door Company.

Former divisions

The Simpson Lumber Company conducted logging operations and was based in Shelton, Washington. Four mills were sold to Interfor and the Shelton property was sold to Sierra Pacific Industries.

The "Simpson Tacoma Kraft Company" produced pulpwood and linerboard products. Previously owned by St. Regis  the mill was acquired by Simpson in 1985 and sold to RockTenn

Railroad
The Simpson Company built and operated a logging railroad known as the Simpson Railroad. When it closed in July 2015 it was the last logging railroad operations in the continental United  and dates back 120 years. The railroad was once extensive and branched out into several hundred miles of forestland in the Olympic Peninsula but at the end was limited to just ten miles of operational track. The rail line was to transport lumber and as a transportation network to remote logging camps and towns. Construction of the railroad line was an engineering feat as demonstrated by the large and complex bridges built to span gorges and the mountainous terrain the railroad traveled through. The Vance Creek Bridge and the High Steel Bridge were built in 1929 and used until 1985 when the line was abandoned. The Vance Creek Bridge still stands, and the High Steel Bridge is still in use as a forest road. The High Steel Bridge is one of the tallest rail bridges in the United States and has been listed in the National Register of Historic Places.

In January 2019, Green Diamond Resources leased the railroad's remaining 10 miles, plus sidings, to the Peninsular Railway and Lumbermen's Museum, a locally based 501(c)3 non-profit organization.  The all-volunteer group is advancing plans to operate several Simpson locomotives and other rolling stock for tourist trains designed to highlight the significant role lumbering and the railroad played in developing the economies of the local area, the Olympic Peninsula, and the entire Pacific Northwest.  The name “Simpson Railroad” and associated graphics and logos have been licensed by Simpson for the museum's use. 

During the summer months portions of the track are also used for pedal car tours by the Vance Creek Railriders.

References

External links

Bloomberg profile

Forest products companies of the United States
Washington (state) railroads
Logging railroads in the United States
Companies based in Mason County, Washington